Tim Jackson may refer to:

Tim Jackson (economist) (born 1957), British ecological economist and professor of sustainable development at the University of Surrey
Tim Jackson (businessman) (born 1965), British businessman, founder of QXL.com
Tim Jackson (sprinter) (born 1969), Australian sprinter 
Tim Jackson (politician) (1907–1975), Australian politician and Tasmanian Leader of the Opposition from 1956 to 1960
Tim Jackson (American football) (born 1965), American football safety
Timothy J. Sullivan (born 1944), American president of the College of William and Mary from 1992 to 2005
Timothy L. Jackson (born 1958), American music theory professor
Timothy Jackson, fictional character and artist in the 2012–2014 novel series Zom-B by Darren Shan